Jonathan Kwitny (March 23, 1941 – November 26, 1998) was an American investigative journalist.

Biography
Kwitny was born in Indianapolis. He earned a bachelor's degree in journalism at the University of Missouri's School of Journalism in 1962, and a master's degree in history at New York University in 1964. Kwitny was married twice. His first wife, with whom he had two daughters, died in 1978. His second wife was the poet Wendy Wood Kwitny, with whom he had two sons. Jonathan Kwitny died of stomach cancer in 1998.

His awards included the George Polk Award for television investigative reporting and the University of Missouri School of Journalism's honor medal for career achievement.  Kwitny was also the author of several books on subjects which ranged from the Nugan Hand Bank scandal to a biography of Pope John Paul II.

Career
Kwitny's career in journalism began as a reporter for the Perth Amboy News Tribune in 1963. In 1971 he joined The Wall Street Journal, where his articles frequently appeared as front-page features. In 1987, together with producer Tom Naughton, Kwitny created a half-hour news program for New York's WNYC-TV called The Kwitny Report. The show was carried on the PBS network and won the Polk Award for television investigative reporting in 1989, but was canceled that same year. At the time of his death, he was working for the Gannett newspaper company.

Kwitny was the author of a number of non-fiction books, including a biography of Pope John Paul II. When Kwitny met John Paul in the Vatican for a private audience in 1998, the Pope's first comment to him was, "I have read your book."

Works

Books
 The Mullendore Murder Case (1974). On the murder of Oklahoma rancher E.C. Mullendore III.
 Shakedown (1977). A novel.
 Vicious Circles: The Mafia in the Marketplace (1979). On Mafia involvement in white-collar crime. Extract via FBI.
 Endless Enemies: The Making of an Unfriendly World (1984). On U.S. foreign policy.
 The Crimes of Patriots: A True Story of Dope, Dirty Money, and the CIA (1988). On the Nugan Hand Bank scandal.
 Acceptable Risks (1992). On unapproved treatments for AIDS.
 The Super Swindlers: The Incredible Record of America's Greatest Financial Scams (1994)
 An update of The Fountain Pen Conspiracy (1973)
 Man of the Century: The Life and Times of Pope John Paul II (1997). .

Book reviews
 "Reinvestigating Watergate: The Elusive Glow of Truth." Review of Secret Agenda, by Jim Hougan. Wall Street Journal (Jan. 3, 1985), p. 9.

References

Further reading
 "John Paul II & the Fall of Communism," by Jane Barnes & Helen Whitney. PBS Frontline (Sep. 1999). Critical of Man of the Century.
 "PBS: The Decline & Fall of 'Public' Broadcasting," by Tara Gadomski and Esben Kjaer. Consortium News. On the cancellation of The Kwitny Report.

External links
 Jonathan Kwitny at Spartacus Educational
 Personal file at the FBI via Internet Archive

1941 births
1998 deaths
American male journalists
20th-century American journalists
American investigative journalists
The Wall Street Journal people
Writers from Indianapolis
Missouri School of Journalism alumni
New York University alumni
George Polk Award recipients
Deaths from cancer in New York (state)
20th-century American non-fiction writers
20th-century American male writers